The 1990 Dutch Open was an ATP men's tennis tournament staged in Hilversum, Netherlands. The tournament was held from 23 July until 29 July 1990. Spain's Francisco Clavet (a lucky loser) won his first individual title of the year, and first of his career. Unseeded Francisco Clavet won the singles title.

Finals

Singles

 Francisco Clavet defeated  Eduardo Masso 3–6, 6–4, 6–2, 6–0

Doubles

 Sergio Casal /  Emilio Sánchez defeated  Paul Haarhuis /  Mark Koevermans, 7–5, 7–5

References

External links
 ITF tournament edition details

Dutch Open (tennis)
Dutch Open (tennis)
Dutch Open
Dutch Open
Dutch Open (tennis), 1990
1990 in Dutch tennis